Félix Omar Fernández Rodríguez (born July 22, 1976) is a retired male track and field athlete. He competed in the sprints events during his career. He competed for Puerto Rico at the 2000 Summer Olympics, where he was eliminated in the first round of the men's 4x100 metres relay, alongside Osvaldo Nieves, Rogelio Pizarro and Jorge Richardson. Fernández ran the fourth and last leg.

References
 

1976 births
Living people
Athletes (track and field) at the 2000 Summer Olympics
Puerto Rican male sprinters
People from Río Piedras, Puerto Rico
Olympic track and field athletes of Puerto Rico